The Grammy Award for Best Rock Gospel Album was awarded from 1991 to 2011.  From 1991 to 1993 the category was awarded as Best Rock/Contemporary Gospel Album. From 2007 to 2011 it was awarded as Best Rock or Rap Gospel Album.

The award was discontinued from 2012 in a major overhaul of Grammy categories. From 2012, recordings in this category were shifted to either Best Contemporary Christian Music Album or Best Gospel Album categories.

Recipients

 Each year is linked to the article about the Grammy Awards held that year.

See also
 List of Christian rock bands
 List of Grammy Award categories

References

General
  Note: User must select the "Gospel" category as the genre under the search feature.

Specific

 
1991 establishments in the United States
Album awards
Awards established in 1991
Grammy Awards for gospel music
Rock Gospel Album